Ham Fisted is the debut studio album by the alternative rock band Local H. It was released through Island Records in January 1995. Though the tracks "Cynic" and "Mayonnaise and Malaise" were released as airplay singles in 1994, the album failed to chart.

Critical reception
Trouser Press wrote that the album "offers an entertaining haymaker of cranked- up, stripped-down ’95 noise."

Track listing
All songs written by Scott Lucas and Joe Daniels.

Personnel
Scott Lucas – vocals, guitar
Joe Daniels – drums
Steve Haigler – producering, engineering, mixing
Tracy Schroeder – additional engineering
Janet DeMatteis - art direction
David Caldery - design
Joe Bosso - A&R
Bud Ludwig - mastering
Jana Leon - photography
Dave Cozzie - assistant engineer

References

Local H albums
1995 debut albums
Island Records albums